Alison Doody (born March 9, 1966) is an Irish actress and model. After making her feature film debut as Bond girl Jenny Flex in A View to a Kill (1985), she went on to play Elsa Schneider in Indiana Jones and the Last Crusade (1989). Other roles include Siobhan Donavan in A Prayer for the Dying (1987), Charlotte in Taffin (1988), Rebecca Flannery in Major League II (1994) and Catherine Buxton in RRR (2022). She also played Pam in Beaver Falls (2011–2012).

Early life
The youngest of three children, Doody was born in Dublin, Ireland. Her mother, Joan, was a beauty therapist, and her father Patrick, worked in the property business and farmed. Doody attended Mount Anville Secondary School.

Career
Approached by a photographer, Doody took up modelling, which turned into a career in commercial modelling. Doody stringently avoided glamour and nude work, a clause which she extended to her acting career. 

Having come to the attention of the casting director of a new James Bond film, she accepted a small part as Jenny Flex in 1985's A View to a Kill. Doody was listed as one of 12 Promising New Actors of 1986 in John Willis' Screen World, Vol. 38. Still only 19 when she appeared in the role, Doody was – and remains – the youngest Bond girl to date. Another early movie was a small part as IRA member Siobhan Donovan in A Prayer for the Dying (1987), which starred Mickey Rourke.

Doody had a non-speaking role in the 1987 television adaptation of The Secret Garden appearing as Archibald Craven's wife, Lilias, in his dream. Her first lead role was in a 1988 episode of Jim Henson fantasy series The Storyteller as Sapsorrow, opposite John Hurt, Dawn French and Jennifer Saunders.

She played opposite Pierce Brosnan in the film Taffin (1988) before taking probably her most high-profile part to date, as Austrian Nazi-sympathiser and archaeologist Elsa Schneider in 1989's Indiana Jones and the Last Crusade playing opposite Harrison Ford. The film also starred Sean Connery as Indy's father; Doody has acted alongside three actors (Moore, Connery, and Brosnan) who have portrayed James Bond.

In 1991 Doody co-starred opposite Jonathan Pryce in mini-series Selling Hitler, inspired by the publishing fraud known as the Hitler Diaries. She subsequently relocated to Hollywood. Chosen to replace Cybill Shepherd as spokeswoman for L'Oréal, she went on to play opposite Charlie Sheen in 1994's Major League II as Flannery, his girlfriend and agent.

After almost a decade away from the screen, Doody returned to acting with a small role in 2003 film The Actors with Michael Caine, playing herself in an award ceremony scene. She played alongside Patrick Swayze in a 2004 television movie adaptation of King Solomon's Mines and also starred in a short called Benjamin's Struggle (2005), a pamphlet about the Holocaust, and in the TV series Waking the Dead (in a two-part episode called "The Fall"). In 2010, Doody shot a part in Danny Dyer's film The Rapture (2010). She later guest starred in RTÉ's medical drama The Clinic., and was set to star in a 2011 remake of horror classic The Asphyx, but the project later stalled.

In 2011 she began the first of two series on E4 comedy-drama Beaver Falls, playing Pam Jefferson. In 2014 she appeared in We Still Kill the Old Way.

On 21 November 2018 she was honoured with the "Almería, tierra de cine" award, and she received a star on Almeria Walk of Fame.

On 20 November 2019 she was announced to be debuting in the Indian film industry with the film RRR.

Personal life
Doody married Gavin O'Reilly, CEO of the Independent News & Media, on 25 June 1994, at the O'Reilly family residence Castlemartin. The couple made their home at Bartra House, a  home overlooking the sea in Dalkey; at the time of purchase, it was the most expensive house in Ireland. The marriage produced two daughters. She separated from O'Reilly in 2004, and divorced him in 2006.

During the 2011 filming of the comedy-drama Beaver Falls in South Africa, Doody met Douglas De Jager, a packaging tycoon from Cape Town. The couple had been keeping their relationship low-key, before De Jager died of a heart attack in July 2012.

She was engaged to businessman Tadhg Geary from 2014 to 2015.

Filmography

Film

Television

Non-acting television

Documentaries

References

External links
 
 

1966 births
Living people
Irish film actresses
Irish television actresses
Irish female models
Actresses from Dublin (city)
People from Dalkey
20th-century Irish actresses
21st-century Irish actresses
People educated at Mount Anville Secondary School
Actresses in Telugu cinema
Models from Dublin (city)